Edward "Ned" Gordon (born June 13, 1948) is an American politician from the state of New Hampshire. A Republican, Gordon has represented the 9th Grafton district in the New Hampshire House of Representatives from 2018 until 2022. He previously served one term in the State House and four in the New Hampshire Senate. He served as a Circuit Court Judge in the New Hampshire Court System from 2005 to 2018. He has served as Town Moderator of Bristol, New Hampshire since 1994.

He has a BA and JD from the University of New Hampshire, and a MBA from Boston College. He is a resident of Bristol and he lives there with his wife, Gayle.

References

|-

|-

1948 births
20th-century American politicians
21st-century American politicians
Carroll School of Management alumni
Living people
Republican Party members of the New Hampshire House of Representatives
Republican Party New Hampshire state senators
University of New Hampshire alumni
People from Franklin, New Hampshire
People from Bristol, New Hampshire